KSBI (channel 52) is a television station in Oklahoma City, Oklahoma, United States, affiliated with MyNetworkTV. It is owned by locally based Griffin Media alongside CBS affiliate and company flagship KWTV-DT (channel 9). Both stations share studios on West Main Street in downtown Oklahoma City, while KSBI's transmitter is located on the city's northeast side.

History

Locke Supply ownership
The UHF channel 52 allocation was contested between two groups that vied to hold the construction permit to build a new station on the frequency. The first prospective permittee was Satellite Broadcasting Company – a religious nonprofit corporation headed by Donald J. Locke, owner of Oklahoma City-based regional hardware store chain Locke Supply Company, and his wife, Wanda McKenzie Locke – which petitioned the Federal Communications Commission (FCC) allocate a ninth television frequency in the Oklahoma City market (originally to have been assigned to Edmond) in the spring of 1979. Satellite Broadcasting filed an application with the FCC for a license and construction permit on October 17, 1980, proposing to sign on a religious television station on the frequency. The second applicant, TV 52 Broadcasting, Inc., filed its own application on January 8, 1981.

The FCC granted the license to Satellite Broadcasting on April 15. 1982; two months later in August 1982, the group applied to use KSBI (standing for Satellite Broadcasting Co., Inc., in reference to the Locke-owned licensee) as the planned station's callsign. After six years of delays in getting KSBI operational, the station first signed on the air on October 3, 1988. KSBI's original studio facilities were housed out of Locke Supply's corporate offices on 82nd Street and Pole Road in southeast Oklahoma City. For its first 16 years on the air, channel 52 was largely run as a religious independent station; station management settled on the format after initially hedging on their original plans to institute a religious format, which had planned to lease free airtime to churches and televangelists. Atypical of most television stations on the air at that time, KSBI originally broadcast on a part-time basis, airing Monday through Fridays from 9:00 a.m. to 12:30 p.m. during a six-month test broadcasting stage. Programming expanded to 9:00 a.m. to 5:00 p.m. by March 1, 1989.

The station was exclusively available over-the-air in the market until June 1993, when must-carry rules passed by the FCC that allowed broadcast stations to request mandatory carriage on cable providers went into effect. Cox Cable—whose Oklahoma City system, at the time, only served the city proper and select inner-city suburbs—began offering KSBI on channel 40 (in 1995, Cox moved the station to channel 9, which suffered from co-channel interference from, ironically, the VHF analog signal of CBS affiliate and eventual sister station KWTV, which continued until Cox moved KSBI's basic cable slot to channel 15 in 2007); Multimedia Cablevision—which served outer suburbs including Edmond, Midwest City, Moore and Bethany, all of which are now served by Cox—placed KSBI on channel 33 at that time. In preparation for the addition to Cox and Multimedia, channel 52 adopted an 18-hour daily schedule from 6:00 a.m. to 12:00 a.m.; the station would begin broadcasting 24 hours a day by 1996. During most of the 1990s and early 2000s, in addition to airing local and nationally syndicated religious programs, KSBI also carried a limited amount of secular sitcoms, Westerns and movies, some of which were cherry-picked from INSP (now The Inspiration Network) and FamilyNet. Despite its format, KSBI did not accept or solicit financial support via monetary contributions from viewers.

Beginning in the 1990s, KSBI gradually signed on a network of translator stations throughout the state. Eventually, because of this wide relay network, channel 52 claimed to have the largest broadcast coverage area of any commercial television station in Oklahoma; at its peak, its signal was relayed over fourteen translators serving areas within the Oklahoma City market and in markets adjacent to it such as Tulsa, Elk City, Ponca City and Ardmore. It also gained cable (and eventually, satellite) coverage in the Tulsa, Wichita, Amarillo, Lawton–Wichita Falls and Ada–Sherman markets. In August 1999, the station upgraded its transmitter from an effective radiated power of 1,355 kW to a total power of three million watts, after installing a new transmitter antenna atop the  broadcast tower on 122nd Street and Kelley Avenue in northeast Oklahoma City.

In June 2000, KSBI began including more family-oriented secular programming in themed evening blocks (consisting of western series and films on Mondays; sports on Tuesdays; music programs on Wednesdays; wildlife, outdoor and automotive series on Thursdays; family-focused series on Fridays; classic comedy series on Saturdays; and religious and gospel music programs on Sundays). The inclusion of more secular programs to the schedule was partially cited because of the decline in Southern gospel music programming available on the syndication market. At that time, KSBI placed guidelines for its advertising and program content, prohibiting certain types of advertising (such as for alcoholic beverages or psychic hotlines), infomercials, telethons or religious programs that solicited donations from viewers.

Sale to Family Broadcasting Group
Following Don Locke's death in February 2000, Locke Supply's board of directors—led by Locke's former wife, Wanda McKenzie, who took over as the company's chief executive officer—were approached by various station owners beginning in April 2001 for offers to acquire KSBI, its regional translator network and low-power sister station KXOC-LP (channel 54, later on channel 41; now defunct). In the interim, KSBI and its sister properties were involuntarily transferred from Locke's estate to an employee stock ownership plan handled by Locke Supply, which received FCC approval on November 17 of that year. The company ultimately decided to sell off the stations to focus on operating the Locke Supply chain that Don Locke founded more than three decades earlier. On October 8, 2001, Locke Supply agreed to sell KSBI to Christian Media Group, a newly formed locally based company that was founded by former KWTV meteorologist Brady Brus; his sister and local media personality Brenda Bennett; John Benefiel, senior pastor of Church on the Rock; and media executive Jerry Mash.

However, Christian Media's agreement to buy the station would fall apart, after the upstart company failed to pay its $15 million bid to purchase KSBI from Locke. The company attempted to accrue the funds to buy the cluster, but were unable to obtain the needed cash, even after it was granted several extensions to come up with the money. Station management subsequently increased the estimated purchase value to $20 million, largely because of the station's then-recent launch of its digital television signal (which was the first in Oklahoma to offer two high definition channels, including one carrying programming from HDNet [now AXS TV] and a simulcast of its analog feed).

Brus and Bennett would get a second chance to acquire KSBI, KXOC and the former's translator network on July 8, 2003, when Locke sold the stations to Family Broadcasting Group of Oklahoma, Inc., a restructuring of the former Christian Media Group that the siblings co-founded with Brady's wife, certified public accountant and treasurer Angie Brus; and Joe Bowie, co-president/CEO of Retirement Investment Advisors Inc. and Seekfirst Media LLC. The deal included permissory rights for Family Broadcasting to take over the operations of KSBI and KXOC-LP under a time-lease agreement effective July 21, which would continue until the acquisition received regulatory approval by the FCC (officially occurring on January 12, 2004); the sale was finalized on March 17, 2004.

After Family Broadcasting assumed full control of the station, KSBI was repositioned as a family-oriented general entertainment independent with syndicated secular programming that contained minimal to no sexual content, overt violence or strong profanity added to the schedule (programs that contained some degree of the aforementioned content were edited—usually through muting of profanity and occasional, abrupt commercial interruptions to omit scenes containing adult material—to fit the station's content standards). Most of the initial secular programs seen on KSBI under Brus' management consisted of sitcoms, drama series and westerns from the 1960s to the early 1990s.

The station also launched a weather department—which it heavily invested in—and aired local weather updates throughout the broadcast day (including five-minute midday, late afternoon and evening updates on weekdays presented by a two-person on-camera weather staff led by Brus, who also served as the station's chief meteorologist in addition to his duties as its owner and general manager), incorporating interactive touch screen technology for its weather presentation and installing a network of remote cameras throughout various cities across Oklahoma (branded as the "KSBI Statecam Network"). In February 2004, the station became the first television station in Oklahoma to provide severe weather watches and warnings in both English and Spanish. Channel 52 also eventually added sporting events to its schedule, consisting mainly of basketball and football games from state high school and Southeastern Conference collegiate teams.

While its syndicated inventory was fairly limited early on, KSBI eventually expanded its programming slate; this began in the fall of 2008 with the additions of NurseTV, Lost and American Chopper, followed the next year by the acquisitions of Deadliest Catch, Cold Case Files, The Martha Stewart Show, Judge Hatchett, My Wife and Kids and then the addition of The King of Queens to the schedule in the spring of 2010.

After reaching a deal with the NBA's Oklahoma City Thunder to telecast select regular season games from Oklahoma City's first long-term major professional sports franchise in 2008, KSBI began branding as "Thunder TV" beginning that October, with the "KSBI 52" brand continuing to be used on a secondary basis. That year, the station also began construction on a new state-of-the-art studio facility on North Morgan Road (south of the John Kilpatrick Turnpike) in Yukon, which was completed in the spring of 2009; KSBI relocated its local programming production and various other operations to the new facility that September. That year, DirecTV began carrying KSBI's programming in the Tulsa area as an out-of-market station (the station was removed from the satellite provider in January 2012 following a carriage dispute between Family Broadcasting Group and DirecTV).

Completing a deal signed between Family Broadcasting management and the natural gas entrepreneurs in January 2007, on September 10, 2009, the FCC approved the transfer of a portion of Family Broadcasting Group's stock to Chesapeake Energy co-founders Aubrey McClendon and Tom L. Ward (the latter of whom would later become the founder of SandRidge Energy), after Family Broadcasting restructured its equity to retire all long-term debt and accelerate growth.

Management and programming changes
On November 1, 2010, Family Broadcasting Group appointed two former area television veterans as its top executives—Vince Orza (former president and CEO of Eatery's Restaurant Management, and two-time candidate for Governor of Oklahoma) was appointed as its president and CEO, and Jerry Hart was named its vice president and operations manager (Orza had earlier announced on October 21 that he would step down as dean of the Meinders School of Business at Oklahoma City University, shortly before he accepted the position); Orza and Hart had worked together at ABC affiliate KOCO-TV (channel 5) as an anchor and production manager, respectively, during the 1980s. That month, Orza began appearing in a promotional campaign that aired on the station, seeking opinions from viewers on programming changes that KSBI should make. The station also divested some of its translators; six were converted into repeaters of former sister station KXOC-LP, while two others based in Enid and Stillwater continued to rebroadcast KSBI's signal. It also began a gradual rebrand under the moniker "OK52"; the "OK52" and "KSBI 52" brandings were both used by the station until May 23, 2011, when KSBI started using the "OK52" branding full-time, before reverting to simply identifying by the KSBI call letters in March 2012.

A further expansion of the station's programming came in January 2011 with the additions of shows such as The Daily Buzz, Judge Karen's Court, Emergency! and Cash Cab, effectively decreasing the number of infomercials on its weekday schedule. Following the management changes at Family Broadcasting Group, KSBI transitioned into a traditional general entertainment independent station (with programs now being aired as is content-wise) featuring recent off-network and first-run syndicated programs as well as the few classic television shows that remained on the schedule; the station also began placing an emphasis on locally produced lifestyle and entertainment programs.

MyNetworkTV affiliation

On June 14, 2012, KSBI announced (through a promo for its Fall 2012 programming slate which was uploaded to the station's official YouTube channel) that it would join the MyNetworkTV programming service that fall, bringing a primary network affiliation to the station's main channel for the first time. The service's programming officially moved to KSBI on September 17; the market's original MyNetworkTV affiliate, KAUT-TV (channel 43), became an independent station with an informal secondary affiliation with Antenna TV (which continued to be carried full-time on sister station KFOR-TV's 4.2 subchannel).

Differing from KAUT-TV (which refrained from using MyNetworkTV branding on-air throughout its six-year tenure with the service), KSBI branded as "MyKSBI" on-air (though it used the "KSBI 52" brand more often beginning in 2013, before becoming its sole brand after the sale to Griffin Communications), and used a secondary visual brand overlaying the "circle" logo used by the station since March 2012 on a red and white version of MyNetworkTV's logo (to match the main station logo's color scheme). Upon receiving the MyNetworkTV affiliation, KSBI expanded its programming inventory by acquiring additional syndicated shows (mainly sitcoms and drama series); it also greatly reduced the amount of infomercials it aired in certain overnight timeslots, eventually limiting them to weekends. KSBI also counterprogrammed shows seen on the major networks and prime time newscasts on KAUT and Fox affiliate KOKH-TV (channel 25) in the 9:00 p.m. hour on weeknights with a nightly lineup of varying programs (mainly drama series).

Cutbacks and sale to Griffin

In September 2014, KSBI cancelled two of its local programs, the talk/lifestyle show Oklahoma Live and game show Wild Card; the station had also, reportedly, laid off most of its employees, aside from its sales and operational staff. The move came as a result of a restructuring and a possible shift away from local programming, along with the possibility that Family Broadcasting would place the station up for sale. Indeed, a sale of KSBI was announced on September 29, 2014, when Family Broadcasting Group announced that the station would be sold to Griffin Communications (now Griffin Media), longtime owner of KWTV (which had previously submitted a bid to acquire KSBI in 2001, only to be beaten by Christian Media Group's competing offer).

Griffin took over the operations of KSBI on December 1, 2014, with the station switching to a pre-recorded feed of its regular programming schedule until the company completed the move of KSBI's master control operations to KWTV's Kelley Avenue studios in northeast Oklahoma City on December 6. The station's programming lineup remained similar (with a few programs carried over from KWTV such as Extra and Dr. Phil as well as reruns of since-discontinued series from Entertainment Studios being added after Griffin took over); in addition, KSBI also began to air CBS programming in the event that extended breaking news or severe weather coverage, or special programming aired on its parent station's main channel requires KWTV to pre-empt it (taking over this responsibility from News 9 Now, a news rebroadcast subchannel on KWTV virtual channel 9.2). Unusual for a recently acquired duopoly outlet, KSBI also ceased all separate programming promotions, outside of a modified version of its final logo under Family Broadcasting ownership that was mainly used to fulfill FCC-mandated station identification requirements; all promotional content that aired on the station thereafter was in the form of news and image promos produced for KWTV, with short-form ID bumper promotions produced for that station being augmented with the KSBI logo in place of that belonging to KWTV.

On March 1, 2017, KSBI began to rebrand itself under the "News 9 Plus" moniker, serving as a branding extension of KWTV, while continuing to focus largely on entertainment programming. Griffin Communications CEO David Griffin said that the rebranding of channel 52 was designed to "help create a more inclusive and consistent identity for all of our programming". The change mirrored similar rebrandings made by Fox Television Stations around this timeframe for that group's MyNetworkTV O&Os and independent stations in markets where Fox operates a duopoly.

On July 12, 2021, Griffin Communications announced that it had reached an agreement with real estate development consortium 100 Main LLC to purchase the Century Center business and retail complex in downtown Oklahoma City for $26 million. Griffin will construct a media and operations center that would house KWTV/KSBI's broadcast facilities and the company's corporate headquarters inside a vacant  section of the space. Griffin will invest $10 million to renovate the building and plans for the move to be completed by summer 2022. All existing tenants are expected to continue leasing space in the building.

Subchannel history

KSBI-DT2
KSBI-DT2 is the Bounce TV-affiliated second digital subchannel of KSBI. Over the air, it broadcasts in standard definition on UHF digital channel 23.2 (or virtual channel 52.2).

In 2003, KSBI launched a digital subchannel on virtual channel 52.2, which served as an affiliate of HDNet, one of the few broadcast television stations in the United States to carry the cable and satellite network. In 2004, after Family Broadcasting Group assumed ownership, the subchannel was converted into a simulcast feed of its low-power sister at the time, KXOC-LP (then affiliated with America One). On February 28, 2011, Luken Communications announced that it had reached an affiliation agreement with Family Broadcasting Group to carry Tuff TV on KXOC-LP/KSBI-DT2, which switched to the network on March 7, 2011. During the first few months of the contract, KSBI also carried select Tuff TV programs on its primary 52.1 signal to fill portions of its Saturday afternoon schedule.

On September 17, 2012, KSBI-DT2 discontinued the KXOC simulcast and became an affiliate of This TV. The network was in the process of being displaced from its original Oklahoma City affiliate, KOCO-TV, after its owner, Hearst Television, reached a long-term deal to carry MeTV (then a sister network to This TV under the ownership of the latter's co-founder, Weigel Broadcasting). Because the station's contract with MeTV did not take effect until October 1, KOCO-DT2 continued to serve as an interim This TV affiliate until September 30, after KSBI-DT2 became the network's primary Oklahoma City affiliate. As a This affiliate, KSBI-DT2 preempted some classic television series or movies that aired during the network's morning schedule (on weekdays from 4:00 to 6:30 (or 7:00) a.m. and weekends from 5:00 to 7:00 a.m., or as late as 8:00 a.m. on either day), in favor of carrying religious, lifestyle and comedy programs to which KSBI held the local syndication rights and infomercials (KSBI-DT2 also preempted This TV programs airing weekdays from 9:00 to 11:00 a.m. from May to September 2013).

Channel 52 also carried feature films that were pre-recorded from the This TV national feed over its main channel. The station aired films carried by the network on channel 52.1 each weekday during the late morning hours from May until September 2013, when it replaced them with syndicated series in the block's designated timeslot; unlike its three UHF competitors, KSBI did not run films on weekends until September 2013, when the station moved the This TV features to Saturdays in prime time. When Griffin assumed KSBI's operations on December 1, 2014, KSBI decommissioned the 52.2 subchannel, citing low viewership (after having been absent from the Oklahoma City market for three weeks after the move, This TV resurfaced on KAUT-TV—whose owner, Tribune Broadcasting, acquired Weigel's 50% interest in the network in November 2013—on December 24, 2014, via a newly created DT2 subchannel). KSBI-DT2 was re-activated on October 1, 2018, to serve as an affiliate of Bounce TV (KSBI-DT2 replaced KTOU-LD [channel 21]—which had carried Bounce on its DT7 feed since February 2018—as the network's Oklahoma City affiliate).

KSBI-DT3
KSBI-DT3 is the Laff-affiliated third digital subchannel of KSBI. Over the air, it broadcasts in standard definition on UHF digital channel 23.3 (or virtual channel 52.3). The subchannel is not currently carried on Cox Communications or on other cable providers within the Oklahoma City market. On September 25, 2018, Griffin Communications announced that it had entered into an agreement with Katz Broadcasting to affiliate KSBI with Katz's four digital multicast networks, Escape, Laff, Grit and Bounce TV (the latter of which is owned by Bounce Media LLC, whose COO Jonathan Katz serves as president/CEO of Katz Broadcasting). As part of the agreement, on October 1 of that year, KSBI launched a digital subchannel on virtual channel 52.3 to serve as an affiliate of Laff. (KSBI-DT3 replaced KTOU-LD9—which had carried Laff since February 2018—as the network's Oklahoma City affiliate.)

KSBI-DT4
KSBI-DT4 is the Grit-affiliated fourth digital subchannel of KSBI. Over the air, it broadcasts in standard definition on UHF digital channel 23.4 (or virtual channel 52.4). On October 1, 2018, as part of the agreement between Griffin Communications and Katz Broadcasting, KSBI launched a digital subchannel on virtual channel 52.4 to serve as an affiliate of Grit. (KSBI-DT4 replaced KTOU-LD8—which had carried Grit since February 2016—as the network's Oklahoma City affiliate.)

KSBI-DT5
KSBI-DT5 is the Ion Mystery-affiliated fifth digital subchannel of KSBI. Over the air, it broadcasts in standard definition on UHF digital channel 23.5 (or virtual channel 52.5). The subchannel is not currently carried on Cox Communications or on other cable providers within the Oklahoma City market. On October 1, 2018, as part of the agreement between Griffin Communications and Katz Broadcasting, KSBI launched a digital subchannel on virtual channel 52.5 to serve as an affiliate of Escape (renamed Court TV Mystery in September 2019, as a brand extension of sister network Court TV). (As Katz's subchannel-leasing agreements are structured as such that some of its networks maintain duplicate affiliations in certain markets, KSBI-DT5 shares the Court TV Mystery affiliation with KAUT, which has carried the network locally on its DT3 subchannel since February 2018 and has served as the exclusive Court TV affiliate for the market via its DT4 feed since that network's May 2019 launch.)

Programming
Syndicated programs broadcast by KSBI  include Dateline, Dish Nation, Law & Crime Daily, Castle, Intervention, The King of Queens and Dr. Phil. In addition to its primary affiliation with the MyNetworkTV programming service, KSBI is designated as an alternate CBS affiliate, and carries network programs that KWTV-DT must preempt to carry extended breaking news or severe weather coverage or special event programming. (The station is not currently used to run select CBS programs that are not cleared to air on KWTV's main channel, with that responsibility continuing to be delegated to its parent station's News 9 Now subchannel.) Since the programming service consists of off-network reruns, KSBI may also broadcast MyNetworkTV programs on tape delay to air in the late prime time or late fringe slots (to fulfill contractual advertising makegoods), in the event that the station carries CBS network programs normally carried on KWTV or sporting events.

From September 2014 until September 2016, the station carried Xploration Station, a live-action educational program block distributed by Steve Rotfeld Productions that is syndicated primarily to Fox owned-and-operated stations and affiliates, on Saturday mornings. KSBI aired the block in lieu of KOKH-TV due to parent company Sinclair Broadcast Group's existing contracts with syndicators to carry other E/I-compliant programming; KOKH assumed the rights to the block in September 2016, through a group-wide distribution agreement with Sinclair's Fox-affiliated stations, with KSBI replacing it with the Litton Entertainment-distributed Go Time.

Local programming
Upon taking over the operations of Family Broadcasting Group in 2010, CEO Vince Orza and vice president Jerry Hart began developing local programming for KSBI that would serve as an alternative to the news-based local programs on other Oklahoma City area stations, featuring a mix of talk, lifestyle and entertainment programs.

Initial local programs produced under Orza and Hart's management of the station—neither of which gained much ratings momentum—included the lifestyle-oriented talk program All About You (which was cancelled in June 2012), local cooking show Oklahoma Cooks (which was cancelled in August 2012), movie review program Hollywood Spotlight (a revival of the program that originally aired on KOCO-TV until 1997, both incarnations were hosted by Dino Lalli; the revived program was cancelled in December 2012) and the sports discussion program OK Sports Wrap (which was cancelled in May 2013). Orza also provided a commentary segment that aired during certain commercial breaks titled Common Sense, in which Orza gave his opinion on a particular national or local news story; these segments were discontinued in 2014.

2011 and 2012 saw the debuts of four new programs: the daytime interview show Oklahoma Live!, country music showcase Oklahoma Centennial Rodeo Opry (a co-production with the Opry Heritage Foundation of Oklahoma, which was taped at the Oklahoma Opry in Oklahoma City's Capitol Hill district, and hosted by local radio DJ Owen Pickard; the program was distributed nationally on Pursuit Channel from September 2012 until its cancellation), Dog Talk (a program aimed at dog owners, hosted by Pat Becker) and College Bowl-style quiz show Mind Games (the program, featuring teams from colleges and universities across Oklahoma, was retitled Mind Games: College Edition in 2012, when a spinoff called Mind Games: High School Edition featuring contestants from Oklahoma high schools debuted). In November 2013, KSBI debuted the trivia game show Wild Card (hosted by former KWTV sports/news anchor and Mind Games host Ed Murray) and Night Music, a weekly music series hosted by Allison Gappa that featured repurposed music performances from Oklahoma Live! (which was cancelled in February 2014). Oklahoma Live and Wild Card were cancelled shortly before the sale to Griffin was announced in September 2014; the remaining local shows were dropped once Griffin took over KSBI that December (of these programs, only Dog Talk continues in production, as KAUT-TV assumed the rights to the program in May 2015).

Sports programming
Under Family Broadcasting Group's management by Brady Brus, KSBI aired sporting events (mainly football and basketball games) from Oklahoma high schools, through a broadcast agreement signed in October 2005 with the Oklahoma Secondary School Activities Association (OSSAA) in which KSBI gained the exclusive rights to televise post-season high school sports tournaments; following Vince Orza and Jerry Hart's acquisition of Family Broadcasting, KSBI declined to renew the OSSAA contract after the 2010 season, with all local high school sporting events airing exclusively on the cable-only Cox Channel thereafter. The station also added Southeastern Conference college football and basketball games supplied by Raycom Sports and Lincoln Financial Sports. In April 2008, KSBI televised select regular season games from the now-defunct Oklahoma City Yard Dawgz Arena Football League team, which ended after the team's Spring 2008 season.

On October 2, 2008, KSBI signed a two-year agreement with the Oklahoma City Thunder NBA franchise (formerly the Seattle SuperSonics until it relocated that year, after the team was unable to obtain government funding for renovations to KeyArena) to broadcast select games starting with the 2008–09 inaugural season in Oklahoma City (with an initial slate of 24 games that season, seventeen of which would be regular season matches beginning with the October 29 season opener against the Milwaukee Bucks). Channel 52 shared the television rights with Fox Sports Oklahoma (which launched in September 2008 as a subfeed of regional sports network Fox Sports Southwest, and was slated to carry 65 additional regionally televised games for the 2008–09 season). The KSBI contract also included rights to air half-hour pre-game and post-game shows, various team-related programs (including the magazine show Thunder Weekly), and overnight/early morning rebroadcasts of each televised game. The station's broadcast relationship with the Thunder ended on August 3, 2010, after the team signed an exclusive multi-year agreement with Fox Sports Oklahoma starting with the 2010–11 season. On May 10, 2012, KSBI began broadcasting Texas Rangers Major League Baseball games on Friday evenings, produced by KTXA-TV in Dallas–Fort Worth; these games moved to KSBI's 52.2 subchannel in 2013, before being discontinued after the subchannel was decommissioned following the takeover of KSBI's operations by Griffin. (The Rangers subsequently signed a 20-year television contract with Fox Sports Southwest, which already simulcast its Rangers telecasts through its Fox Sports Oklahoma subfeed, which gave the regional sports network exclusive rights to Rangers games not aired by ESPN, TBS, Fox or Fox Sports 1.)

Under Griffin Communications ownership, KSBI refocused its sports content around local and state teams. On July 24, 2015, Griffin announced an agreement with the OSSAA that would return high school football coverage to KSBI after a five-year sabbatical; the deal encompasses weekly games during the regular season on Friday and select Thursday evenings (branded as the Oklahoma Ford High School Football Game of the Week) as well as over-the-air rights to the Class 5A and 6A football championships; the 2015 season saw an initial slate of 11 games—all but two of which aired on Friday nights—beginning with a September 3 game between the Norman North Timberwolves and the Norman Tigers at Oklahoma Memorial Stadium (which aired on tape delay due to a scheduled NFL preseason game between the Kansas City Chiefs and the St. Louis Rams that was deferred to KSBI from KWTV, which held local rights to Rams preseason games at the time, due to CBS programming commitments). All games are simulcast on KWTV's website (although select games, particularly during the playoffs, are alternately broadcast on News 9 Now); for the 2015 season, KSBI aired a rebroadcast of the week's game on Sunday afternoons. KSBI aired the weekly regular season games until the 2018 high school football season. The agreement with the OSSAA would eventually expand to include coverage of the Class 5A and 6A boys' and girls' high school basketball championship games beginning in 2017.

On March 8, 2016, the station reached an agreement with OKC Energy FC to become the exclusive broadcast home of the United Soccer League club's home matches at Taft Stadium, starting with the March 26 regular season opener against Colorado Springs Switchbacks FC; all games were produced by event streaming provider VISTA Worldlink. The contract ended after the Energy's 2018 season, with the team's matches being relegated mainly to the ESPN+ streaming service thereafter. On November 8 of that year, Griffin reached an agreement to carry games from the Oklahoma City Blue (the Thunder's NBA Development League affiliate) starting with the 2016–17 season, with an initial slate of 23 of the team's home games (which are held at the Cox Convention Center with former KWTV sports/news anchor Ed Murray doing play-by-play); the first Blue game to be telecast on the station was the November 11 home opener against the Maine Red Claws.

Newscasts
Immediately following the sale to Family Broadcasting Group, KSBI began airing occasional local breaking news cut-ins. In 2004, KSBI launched a weekday morning news and talk program called Hello Oklahoma, which was hosted by Family Broadcasting executive Brenda Bennett, alongside former KWTV weekend evening anchor Scott Coppenbarger for its first year on the air before he was replaced by Dino Lalli; the two-hour program was canceled in 2006. Subsequently, that September, KSBI launched an hour-long early evening newscast, Oklahoma News Tonight (later renamed KSBI-TV News); originally anchored by Kealey McIntire and Monica Price, the program competed against the 5:30 p.m. national evening newscasts and the locally produced 6:00 p.m. newscasts on KFOR-TV (channel 4), KOCO-TV and KWTV (channel 9). In addition, KSBI aired prime time Presidential press conferences and State of the Union addresses, as well as national breaking news stories, using wire news video supplied by CNN Newsource.

In September 2009, KSBI suspended production of Oklahoma News Tonight as the station began relocating its operations to the newly built Yukon studios; the suspension was intended to be temporary until the move was completed. News programming was then limited to five-minute updates that aired each half-hour from 5:00 to 6:30 p.m., which continued even after KSBI began operating out of the Yukon studios. In August 2010, station management unveiled plans to produce a late evening newscast that would have competed with the existing in-house 9:00 p.m. newscast on KOKH-TV and a KFOR-produced prime time newscast on KAUT-TV.

On November 12, 2010, Family Broadcasting Group announced that KSBI would cease all news and weather content, and laid off the remainder of its news staff, as well as some employees in the station's production and sales departments. Brian Birchell and Kealey McIntire (who respectively served as sports and news anchors for Oklahoma News Tonight) were retained, with Birchell becoming host of OK Sports Wrap and McIntire as host of the lifestyle program All About You, both of which premiered in 2011 (Birchell departed in early 2012, while McIntire left after the June 2012 cancellation of All About You). The set at the Yukon studio that was initially used for the news segments (and was to be used for the aborted prime time newscast) would be repurposed for the station's locally produced entertainment and talk programs. In January 2011, KSBI began airing the syndicated news and entertainment show The Daily Buzz on weekday mornings (the first hour of the program—which previously aired on KAUT-TV from June 2004 to September 2010—was aired exclusively, on a half-hour delay from 5:30 to 6:30 a.m., until The Daily Buzz was cancelled in April 2015).

In February 2014, KSBI began airing weather updates during the station's daytime and evening programming, with forecast segments produced by WeatherVision airing daily at 12:59, 6:59 and 10:59 p.m., along with a static graphic that was shown hourly featuring the current temperature and a four-day extended forecast; these updates were discontinued once Griffin Communications assumed the station's operations. On February 3, 2015, two months after Griffin Communications took ownership of the station, KSBI began airing a simulcast of KWTV's noon newscast.

Technical information

Subchannels
The station's digital signal is multiplexed:

Analog-to-digital conversion
KSBI began transmitting a digital television signal on UHF channel 51 on February 1, 2003. The station chose to continue to simultaneously operate its analog and digital signals past the original February 17, 2009 digital television transition deadline; as KSBI operated a weather department at the time, this was done in order to enable viewers that were not prepared for the transition to continue receiving emergency weather information during the Spring 2009 severe weather season. The station discontinued regular programming on its analog signal, over UHF channel 52, on June 1, 2009. The station's digital signal remained on its pre-transition UHF channel 51, using PSIP to display KSBI's virtual channel as 52 on digital television receivers, which was among the high band UHF channels (52-69) that were removed from broadcasting use as a result of the transition.

On July 18, 2014, the FCC granted an application to relocate KSBI's digital signal to UHF channel 23; the station continued to operate its existing UHF 51 signal under a special temporary authority (STA), with an on-screen message directing viewers to rescan their digital tuners to receive the UHF 23 signal until KSBI ceased broadcasting on UHF channel 51 on August 1, 2014.

Translators
To reach viewers throughout the 34 counties comprising the Oklahoma City market, KSBI extends its over-the-air coverage area through a network of four low-power translator stations – all of which transmit using virtual channel 52 – encompassing west-central Oklahoma that distribute its programming beyond the  range of its broadcast signal. Due to prior divestitures of other translators, KSBI is the only major commercial television station in the Oklahoma City market that does not have translator relays in northwestern or southwestern Oklahoma.

References

External links
 News9.com/News-9-Plus – KSBI official webpage

MyNetworkTV affiliates
Bounce TV affiliates
Laff (TV network) affiliates
Grit (TV network) affiliates
Ion Mystery affiliates
Griffin Media
Television channels and stations established in 1988
1988 establishments in Oklahoma
SBI